Heris is a city in East Azerbaijan Province, Iran.

Heris may also refer to:

Heris, Maragheh, a village in East Azerbaijan Province, Iran
Heris, Marand, a village in East Azerbaijan Province, Iran
Heris, Sarab, a village in East Azerbaijan Province, Iran
Heris, Shabestar, a village in East Azerbaijan Province, Iran
Heris, Ardabil, a village in Ardabil Province, Iran
Heris County, an administrative subdivision of Iran